Joliet Public Schools District 86 is an elementary and middle school district headquartered in Joliet, Illinois.

In 2009, almost 63% of the district's students were classified as low income, compared to 23.4% of Will County students overall.

The district feeds into Joliet Township High School District 204.

Schools

Junior high schools:
 Dirksen
 Gompers
 Hufford
 Washington

Elementary schools:
 Culbertson
 Cunningham
 Craughwell
 Eisenhower
 Farragut
 Forest Park 	 
 Jefferson 	 
 Keith 	 
 Marshall 	 
 Pershing 	 
 Sanchez 	 
 Sandburg 	 
 Singleton 	 
 Taft 	 
 Thigpen 	 	 
 Woodland

Early Childhood Centers:
Marycrest

Alternate School:
Thompson

References

External links
 

School districts in Will County, Illinois
Education in Joliet, Illinois